The 2019 Firenze Tennis Cup was a professional tennis tournament played on clay courts. It was the second edition of the tournament which was part of the 2019 ATP Challenger Tour. It took place in Florence, Italy between 23 and 29 September 2019.

Singles main-draw entrants

Seeds

 1 Rankings are as of 16 September 2019.

Other entrants
The following players received wildcards into the singles main draw:
  Carlos Alcaraz
  Enrico Dalla Valle
  Philipp Kohlschreiber
  Lorenzo Musetti
  Giulio Zeppieri

The following player received entry into the singles main draw using a protected ranking:
  Íñigo Cervantes

The following players received entry from the qualifying draw:
  Benjamin Bonzi
  Jules Okala

The following player received entry as a lucky loser:
  Riccardo Balzerani

Champions

Singles

 Marco Trungelliti def.  Pedro Sousa 6–2, 6–3.

Doubles

 Luca Margaroli /  Adil Shamasdin def.  Gerard Granollers /  Pedro Martínez 7–5, 6–7(6–8), [14–12].

References

2019 ATP Challenger Tour
2019 in Italian tennis
September 2019 sports events in Italy